Rhagoletis tabellaria is a species of tephritid or fruit fly in the genus Rhagoletis of the family Tephritidae.

References

tabellaria
Insects described in 1855